Quercus gravesii (also called Chisos red oak or Grave's oak) is an uncommon North American species of oak in the red oak section Quercus section Lobatae. It is found in Mexico and the United States.

The leaves are hairless, each with 3–5 pointed and awned lobes. The bark is black.

It is closely related to shumard oak and emory oak.

Distribution
Grave's oak can be found in three areas of southwest Texas, including Big Bend National Park, and mountain ranges of neighboring Coahuila state.

References

gravesii
Flora of Texas
Trees of Coahuila
Least concern flora of North America
Least concern flora of the United States
Plants described in 1927
Taxonomy articles created by Polbot
Oaks of Mexico